The 2017–18 Greek Basket League was the 78th season of the Greek Basket League, the top-tier level professional club basketball league in Greece. The season started on October 7th, 2017, and ended on June 17th, 2018.

Teams

Promotion and relegation
Apollon Patras, and Doxa Lefkadas were relegated after the 2016–17 Greek Basket League.  Panionios and Gymnastikos Larissas Faros were promoted from the 2016–17 Greek A2 Basket League.

Locations and arenas

Personnel and kits

Regular season

League table

Results

Playoffs
The eight highest ranked teams in the regular season qualified for the playoffs.

Teams in bold won the playoff series. Numbers to the left of each team indicate the team's original playoff seeding. Numbers to the right indicate the score of each playoff game.

Bracket

Quarterfinals
The higher-seeded team played the first and third leg (if necessary) at home. The first legs were played on 16 May, while the second legs were played on 19 May 2018.

|}

Semifinals
The higher-seeded team played the first, second and fifth leg (if necessary) at home. The first legs were played on 24 May, while the second legs were played on 26 May 2018.

|}

Finals

|}

3rd Place Final

|}

Final standings

Awards

MVP
 Nick Calathes – Panathinaikos

Best Young Player
 Antonis Koniaris – PAOK

Best Defender
 Nick Calathes – Panathinaikos

Most Improved Player
 Christos Saloustros – Promitheas Patras

Coach of the Year
 Xavi Pascual – Panathinaikos

Best Five

Clubs in European-wide competitions

See also
2017–18 Greek Basketball Cup
2017–18 Greek A2 Basket League (2nd tier)

References

External links 
 Official Basket League Site 
 Official Basket League Site 
 Official Hellenic Basketball Federation Site 

Greek Basket League seasons
1
Greek